Kai Theodor Erikson (born February 12, 1931) is an Austrian-born American sociologist, noted as an authority on the social consequences of catastrophic events. He served as the 76th president of the American Sociological Association.

Life and career
Erikson was born in Vienna, the son of Joan Erikson (née Serson), a Canadian-born artist, dancer, and writer, and Erik Erikson, a German-born famed psychologist and sociologist. His maternal grandfather was an Episcopalian minister, and Erikson was raised a Protestant. Erikson graduated from The Putney School in Vermont, Reed College in Oregon and earned a PhD at the University of Chicago. He joined the faculty of the University of Pittsburgh in 1959 where he held a joint appointment at the School of Medicine and in the Department of Sociology. There he met his future wife Joanna Slivka, who became Joanna Erikson.

In 1963 he moved to Emory University, and followed that with a move to  Yale University in 1966.  He now holds the title of William R. Kenan, Jr. Professor Emeritus of Sociology and American Studies.

Erikson edited the Yale Review from 1979 to 1989.

Wayward Puritans
Wayward Puritans is the title of his first book (1966) which contains a chapter on sociology of deviance and a chapter on the Massachusetts Bay Colony before three illustrations of deviance within the colony. The first was associated with Anne Hutchinson and Governor Vane and called the Antinomian Controversy. The second was concerned with an  intrusion of Quakers, while the third was the  Salem witch trials. The book notes the deviation from the City upon a Hill ideal set by John Winthrop. 
 
H. Lawrence Ross described the book as "fascinating  and superbly written". The sociological premise explored is from Émile Durkheim: "a function of deviance is to define the normative boundaries of the group." He notes that it is "a remarkable exception to the well-known tendency of sociological research to focus on the here and now." On the statistical analysis Ross comments: "the reasons to expect constancy of deviance over time, such as the limited capacity of the control system, would seem to predict stability of convictions as much as stability of offenders, and in consequence the analysis here seems unsatisfactory.”

Aftermaths of disasters
Erikson subsequently studied a number of disasters in the context of their sociological implications, including the nuclear fallout in the Marshall Islands in 1954; the Buffalo Creek flood in West Virginia in 1972 (resulting in the award-winning 1978 book Everything In Its Path); the Three Mile Island nuclear accident in 1979; the Exxon Valdez oil spill in 1989; and the genocide in Yugoslavia of 1992 to 1995.

Bibliography
Wayward Puritans: A Study in the Sociology of Deviance (1966)
Everything in its Path: Destruction of Community in the Buffalo Creek Flood (1978)
A New Species of Trouble: Explorations in Disaster, Trauma, and Community (1994)

References

1931 births
Living people
Austrian emigrants to the United States
American social sciences writers
American sociologists
Environmental sociologists
Presidents of the American Sociological Association
Reed College alumni
University of Chicago alumni
University of Pittsburgh faculty
Yale University faculty
The Putney School alumni